Christopher J. McGurk (born January 16, 1957) became the chairman and chief executive officer of Cinedigm Digital Cinema in January 2011. He serves as director of Cookie Jar Entertainment Holdings, the Foundation of Motion Picture Pioneers; the American Cinematheque board of directors; and the Entertainment Industries Council board of trustees. McGurk received the H.E.L.P. Group's “Spirit of Hope Award” in 2002, and its “Leader of Vision“ award in 2003.

Cinedigm
Cinedigm (or Cinedigm Corp.) is a North American entertainment company, headquartered in Los Angeles, California. Cinedigm is engaged in digital cinema, software, and content marketing and distribution. Cinedigm is an independent content distributor in the United States, with a library of 50,000 films and TV episodes, and direct relationships with over 60,000 physical stores and digital retailers, including Wal-Mart, Best Buy, Target, iTunes, Netflix, and Amazon, as well as the national Video On Demand platform on cable television. In addition, the company offers content marketing and distribution services in theatrical and ancillary home entertainment markets to alternative and independent movie content owners, as well as to theatrical exhibitors.

Career
Chris McGurk received a Bachelor of Science degree in accounting from Syracuse University School of Management and a Master of Business Administration degree from the University of Chicago Graduate School of Business.

He served as executive vice president and chief financial officer thereof from 1990 to 1994, and the president of Walt Disney Studios, a division of The Walt Disney Company, from 1994 to 1996.

From 1996 to 1999, McGurk joined Universal Pictures, where he served in various executive capacities, including president and chief operating officer

From 1999 to 2005, McGurk was vice chairman of the board and chief operating officer of Metro-Goldwyn-Mayer Inc. (“MGM”), acting as the company’s lead operating executive until MGM was sold. In 2003, Premiere Magazine’s annual Power 100 List Ranked McGurk #24 with MGM Chairman Alex Yemenidjian.

McGurk played the leading role in MGM's reinvigoration, spearheading efforts that resulted MGM's industry leadership in Home Entertainment library sales, marketing and distribution. McGurk maximized the asset value of Hollywood's largest modern film library, transformed the Hollywood's largest modern film library's United Artists label into a specialty film unit and negotiated strategic alliances with Twentieth Century Fox and NBC.

He served as senior advisor of new ventures of Starz Media LLC (also called IDT Entertainment, Inc.) from April 5, 2006, to November 2006.

McGurk founded and served as the chief executive officer of Overture Films, LLC, wholly owned subsidiary of Starz, LLC, from November 13, 2006, to July 2010. He was also CEO of Anchor Bay Entertainment, which distributed Overture Films’ product to the home entertainment industry.

References

External links

Living people
American media executives
Fellows of the American Academy of Arts and Sciences
American chief executives
American chairpersons of corporations
American film producers
1957 births
Syracuse University alumni
University of Chicago alumni
People from Boston